Maid in Japan is the debut mini-album by Japanese all-female rock band Band-Maid (stylized as BAND-MAID®). It was released on January 8, 2014. The album did not chart during its initial release. The album was reissued with two bonus tracks on February 14, 2018, and that version reached number 26 on the Japanese Oricon Albums Chart, selling 2,994 copies.

Track listing

Personnel
Band-Maid
Saiki Atsumi – lead vocals (except tracks 6 and 10)
Miku Kobato – rhythm guitar, vocals, lead vocals on tracks 6 and 10
Kanami Tōno – lead guitar
Misa – bass
Akane Hirose – drums

Charts

References

Band-Maid albums
2014 debut albums
Nippon Crown albums
Japanese-language albums